Jean-Paul Kielo-Lezi (born 4 May 1984 in Kinshasa) is a Congolese footballer who plays as a striker.

Club career
He previously played for FC Denderleeuw, Verbroedering Denderhoutem, K.S.C. Lokeren Oost-Vlaanderen and Y.R. K.V. Mechelen in Belgium.

References
K.V. Mechelen bio
 Profile & stats - Lokeren

1984 births
Living people
Footballers from Kinshasa
Democratic Republic of the Congo footballers
Democratic Republic of the Congo international footballers
K.S.C. Lokeren Oost-Vlaanderen players
K.V. Mechelen players
S.K. Beveren players
Association football forwards
21st-century Democratic Republic of the Congo people